My Life in the Bush of Ghosts is a studio album by Brian Eno and David Byrne, released in February 1981. It was Byrne's first album without his band Talking Heads. The album integrates sampled vocals and found sounds, African and Middle Eastern rhythms, and electronic music techniques. It was recorded before Eno and Byrne's work on Talking Heads' 1980 album Remain in Light, but problems clearing samples delayed its release by several months.

The extensive sampling on My Life is considered innovative, though its influence on later sample-based music genres is debated. Pitchfork named it the 21st best album of the 1980s, while Slant Magazine named it the 83rd.

Recording

Eno and Byrne first worked together on More Songs About Buildings and Food, the 1978 album by Byrne's band Talking Heads. My Life in the Bush of Ghosts was primarily recorded during a break between the Talking Heads albums Fear of Music (1979) and Remain in Light (1980), both produced by Eno. Eno had also recently recorded Fourth World, Vol. 1: Possible Musics with Jon Hassell, who intended to collaborate with Eno and Byrne on the album, but could not afford to fly to California for the recording sessions. Upon hearing the tapes, Hassell felt "outraged" at what he felt was an appropriation of his music.

Eno described My Life as a "vision of a psychedelic Africa". Rather than conventional pop or rock singing, most of the vocals are sampled from other sources, such as commercial recordings of Arabic singers, radio disc jockeys, and an exorcist. Musicians had previously used similar sampling techniques, but, according to Guardian writer Dave Simpson, sampling had never before been used "to such cataclysmic effect". In 2001, Eno cited Holger Czukay's experiments with dictaphones and shortwave radios as earlier examples of sampling. He felt that the "difference was, I suppose, that I decided to make [sampling] the lead vocal". The release was delayed while legal rights were sought for the large number of samples used on the album. A sample of an evangelist Kathryn Kuhlman performing an exorcism intended for "The Jezebel Spirit" was refused by her estate as they objected to the context it was to be used in.

The album title is derived from Amos Tutuola's 1954 novel My Life in the Bush of Ghosts. According to Byrne's 2006 liner notes, neither he nor Eno had read the novel, but they felt the title "seemed to encapsulate what this record was about".

Soon after the album was released, the Islamic Council of Great Britain objected to the use of samples of Qur'anic recital in the track "Qu'ran", considering it blasphemy. Byrne and Eno removed the track from later pressings. In 2006, Byrne said:

Two tracks on the album, "Regiment" and "The Carrier", sample the voice of Lebanese singer Dunya Younes (credited in the album's liner notes as Dunya Yunis). Although Byrne and Eno took care to clear the samples with the label that released the album her vocals had been sampled from, as well as paid for the sampling accordingly, Younes was unaware of the use of her voice on the album until 2017. Both songs were taken down from streaming services after a family representative contacted the duo a year later, and the songs were later reinstated when the issue was settled amicably out of court.

Samples
The following notes are adapted from the album's liner notes and indicate the voices sampled.

Side one
"America Is Waiting" – Ray Taliaferro of KGO Newstalk AM 810 (unidentified in the liner notes); San Francisco, April 1980.
"Mea Culpa" – inflamed caller and smooth politician replying, both unidentified; radio call-in show, New York, July 1979.
"Regiment" – Dunya Younes, Lebanese mountain singer; from "Abu Zeluf" on Music in the World of Islam, Volume One: The Human Voice (Tangent TGS 131).
"Help Me Somebody" – Reverend Paul Morton; broadcast sermon, New Orleans, June 1980.
"The Jezebel Spirit" – unidentified exorcist; New York, September 1980.
Side two

"Qu'ran" – Algerian Muslims chanting the Qur'an; from "Recitation of Verses of the Qu'ran" on Music in the World of Islam, Volume One: The Human Voice (Tangent TGS 131).
"Moonlight in Glory" – The Moving Star Hall Singers; Sea Island, Georgia; from Sea Island Folk Festival (Folkways FS 3841), produced by Guy Carawan.
"The Carrier" – Dunya Younes (same source as track 3)
"A Secret Life" – Samira Tewfik, Lebanese popular singer; from Les Plus Grands Artistes du Monde Arabe (EMI).
"Come with Us" – unidentified radio evangelist; San Francisco, April 1980.

Production

Packaging
The original package design was created by Peter Saville. The cover image was created by pasting small cutout humanoid shapes onto a monitor and pointing a camera at it to create video feedback, infinitely multiplying the shapes. Byrne said of the process: "Somehow, despite it being very techie, these techniques also seemed analogous to what we were doing on the record. It was funky as well as being techie. Extremely lo-tech, actually, and not what you were supposed to do with a TV set."

Music videos
The official short films accompanying two tracks, "America Is Waiting" and "Mea Culpa", were each made by collage filmmaker Bruce Conner.

Reception and legacy

According to music journalist Simon Reynolds, many initial reviews of My Life in the Bush of Ghosts dismissed the album as "an eggheads-in-the-soundlab experimental exercise." In Rolling Stone, Jon Pareles rated the album four out of five stars and applauded it as "an undeniably awesome feat of tape editing and rhythmic ingenuity" that generally avoids "exoticism or cuteness" by "complementing the [speech] sources without absorbing them". Village Voice critic Robert Christgau was less impressed, giving it a "C+" and finding the recordings "as cluttered and undistinguished as the MOR fusion and prog-rock it brings to the mind's ear," while lacking "the songful sweep of Remain in Light or the austere weirdness of Jon Hassell".

In later years, My Life has come to be regarded as a highly influential album, particularly in its use and treatment of sampled source material. AllMusic critic John Bush describes it as a "pioneering work for countless styles connected to electronics, ambience and Third World music". The Independents Andy Gill found the album groundbreaking in its recontextualisation of sampling in a less overtly avant-garde context, with its sampled sounds instead being "marshalled by funk rhythms into repetitive hooks." Writing in The Observer, Jason Cowley said that its immediate influence was felt "in the work of young artists of ambition, from David Sylvian to Kate Bush", and subsequently on later acts, among them electronic artists such as Massive Attack, Moby, and Thievery Corporation. Chris Dahlen of Pitchfork felt that while its sampled vocals had lost some of their revolutionary impact, the album mostly lives up to its critical reputation "as a near-masterpiece, a milestone of sampled music, and a peace summit in the continual West-meets-rest struggle."

In a 1985 interview, Kate Bush said that My Life had "left a very big mark on popular music". Pink Floyd keyboardist Richard Wright said it "knocked me sideways when I first heard it – full of drum loops, samples and soundscapes. Stuff that we really take for granted now, but which was unheard of in all but the most progressive musical circles at the time... The way the sounds were mixed in was so fresh, it was amazing." Hank Shocklee of hip hop production collective the Bomb Squad cited the album as an influence on the Bomb Squad's sample-driven production work for the group Public Enemy.

Reissue
My Life in the Bush of Ghosts was reissued on 27 March 2006 in the United Kingdom and on 11 April 2006 in the United States, remastered and with seven extra tracks. To mark the reissue, the entire multitracks for two songs – "Help Me Somebody" and "A Secret Life" – were made available to download. Under the Creative Commons license, members of the public are able to download the multitracks and use them for their own remixes.

Track listing

For the 1981 second edition, the track "Qu'ran" was removed at the request of the Islamic Council of Great Britain. In its place "Very, Very Hungry" (length: 3:21), previously released as the B-side of "The Jezebel Spirit" 12" single, was substituted. The first edition of the CD (1986) included both tracks, with "Very, Very Hungry" as a bonus track. Later editions (1990 and later) followed the revised LP track order without "Qu'ran".

Ghosts
A widely circulated bootleg of outtakes was released in 1992 as Klondyke Records KR 21. Sound quality is nearly equal to the original CD release.
"Interview" – 3:03 (excerpt from Brian's February 2, 1980 KPFA-FM interview, where he discusses recording the album)
"Mea Culpa" – 4:56
"Into the Spirit Womb"  (actual title as spoken on the track is "Into the Spirit World") – 6:07 ("The Jezebel Spirit" with the original Kathryn Kuhlman vocals, which her estate refused to license)
"Regiment"  (Byrne, Eno, Jones) – 4:13
"The Friends of Amos Tutuola" – 2:01 ("Two Against Three" in the official 2006 re-release)
"America Is Waiting"  (Byrne, Eno, Bill Laswell, Wright, David Van Tieghem) – 3:42
"The Carrier" – 4:22
"Very Very Hungry" – 3:25
"On the Way to Zagora" – 2:43 ("Pitch to Voltage" in the official 2006 re-release)
"Les Hommes Ne Le Sauront Jamais" – 3:33 ("Number 8 Mix" in the official 2006 re-release)
"A Secret Life" – 2:34
"Come with Us" – 2:42
"Mountain of Needles" – 2:31

Except as noted, the tracks are the same mix as originally released.

2006 expanded issue
Remastered, with bonus tracks. 2, 3, 7 and 8 are longer than on the original album.
"America Is Waiting"  (Byrne, Eno, Laswell, Wright, Van Tieghem) – 3:38
"Mea Culpa" – 4:57
"Regiment"  (Byrne, Eno, Jones) – 4:11
"Help Me Somebody" – 4:17
"The Jezebel Spirit" – 4:56
"Very, Very Hungry" – 3:21
"Moonlight in Glory" – 4:30
"The Carrier" – 4:19
"A Secret Life" – 2:31
"Come with Us" – 2:42
"Mountain of Needles" – 2:39
"Pitch to Voltage" – 2:38
"Two Against Three" – 1:55
"Vocal Outtakes" – 0:36
"New Feet" – 2:26
"Defiant" – 3:41
"Number 8 Mix" – 3:30
"Solo Guitar with Tin Foil" – 3:00
Enhanced CD video content: "Mea Culpa" (music video by Bruce Conner)

Personnel
Credits are adapted from the liner notes for the album's 2006 reissue.

David Byrne and Brian Eno – guitars, bass guitars, synthesizers, drums, percussion, found objects (Eno plays the synthesizer solo on "Regiment")
John Cooksey – drums on "Help Me Somebody" and "Qu'ran"
Chris Frantz – drums on "Regiment"
Robert Fripp – Frippertronics on "Regiment"
Michael "Busta Cherry" Jones – bass guitar on "Regiment"
Dennis Keeley – bodhrán on "Mea Culpa"
Bill Laswell – bass guitar on "America Is Waiting"
Mingo Lewis – batá, sticks on "The Jezebel Spirit" and "The Carrier"
Prairie Prince – can, bass drum on "The Jezebel Spirit" and "The Carrier"
José Rossy – congas, agong-gong on "Moonlight in Glory"
Steve Scales – congas, metals on "Help Me Somebody"
David Van Tieghem – drums, percussion (scrap metal, found objects) on "America Is Waiting" and "Regiment"
Tim Wright – click bass on "America Is Waiting"
Rooks on "Help Me Somebody" courtesy of April Potts, recorded at Eglingham Hall

Charts

Release history

References

External links

Website for the 2006 reissue
Transcriptions, and possible alternatives, of the "lyrics"
America Is Waiting and Mea Culpa on IMDb

1981 albums
Albums produced by Brian Eno
Albums produced by David Byrne
Arabic-language albums
Brian Eno albums
Collaborative albums
David Byrne albums
E.G. Records albums
EMI Records albums
Experimental rock albums
Nonesuch Records albums
Sire Records albums
Funk rock albums by English artists
Funk rock albums by Scottish artists
Collage film
Sampledelia albums